Agonopterix yamatoensis is a moth in the family Depressariidae. It was described by K. Fujisawa in 1985. It is found in Japan.

References

Moths described in 1985
Agonopterix
Moths of Japan